Gavrila Törok (born 7 May 1919) was a Romanian water polo player. He competed in the men's tournament at the 1952 Summer Olympics.

References

External links
 

1919 births
Possibly living people
Romanian male water polo players
Olympic water polo players of Romania
Water polo players at the 1952 Summer Olympics
Sportspeople from Timișoara